Gábor István Szabó (March 8, 1936 – February 26, 1982) was a Hungarian American guitarist whose style incorporated jazz, pop, rock, and Hungarian music.

Early years
Szabó was born in Budapest, Hungary. He began playing guitar at the age of 14. In the aftermath of the Hungarian revolution of 1956, he moved to California and later attended the Berklee College of Music in Boston between 1958 and 1960.

Career
In 1961, Szabó became member of a quintet that was led by Chico Hamilton and included Charles Lloyd, playing what has been described as chamber jazz, with "a moderate avant-gardism." Szabó was influenced by the rock music of the 1960s, particularly the use of feedback. In 1965 he was in a jazz pop group led by Gary McFarland, then worked again with Lloyd in an energetic quartet with Ron Carter and Tony Williams. The song "Gypsy Queen" from Szabó's debut solo album Spellbinder became a hit for rock guitarist Carlos Santana. During the late 1960s, Szabó worked in a group with guitarist Jimmy Stewart. He started the label Skye Records with McFarland and Cal Tjader.

Szabó continued to be drawn to more popular, commercial music in the 1970s. He performed often in California, combining elements of Gypsy and Indian music with jazz. He returned often to his home country of Hungary to perform, and it was there that he died just short of his 46th birthday.

Death
While visiting family in Budapest during the Christmas holiday, Szabó was admitted to the hospital and finally succumbed to the liver and kidney ailments he suffered from and died on February 26, 1982. He was buried in Farkasréti Cemetery.

Discography

As leader
 Gypsy '66 (Impulse!, 1965 [rel. 1966])
 Spellbinder (Impulse!, 1966)
 Simpático (Impulse!, 1966) - with Gary McFarland
 Jazz Raga (Impulse!, 1966 [rel. 1967])
 The Sorcerer (Impulse!, 1967)
 More Sorcery (Impulse!, 1967 [rel. 1968])
 Light My Fire (Impulse!, 1967) - with Bob Thiele
 Wind, Sky and Diamonds (Impulse!, 1967)
 Bacchanal (Skye, 1968)
 Dreams (Skye, 1968)
 1969 (Skye, 1969) 
 Lena & Gabor (Skye, 1969 [rel. 1970]) - with Lena Horne
 Magical Connection (Blue Thumb, 1970)
 High Contrast (Blue Thumb, 1971) - with Bobby Womack
 Small World (Four Leaf Clover [Sweden], 1972)
 Mizrab (CTI, 1972 [rel. 1973])
 Rambler (CTI, 1973 [rel. 1974]) 
 Gabor Szabo Live (Blue Thumb, 1974) - with Charles Lloyd; recorded 1972
 Macho (Salvation/CTI, 1975)
 Nightflight (Mercury, 1976) 
 Faces (Mercury, 1977) 
 Belsta River (Four Leaf Clover [Sweden], 1978)
 Femme Fatale (Pepita, 1981)
 The Szabo Equation: Jazz/Mysticism/Exotica (DCC Jazz, 1990)
 In Budapest (Moiras, 2008) - broadcast TV recordings from 1974
 In Budapest Again (Kept Alive Records, 2018) - broadcast TV recordings between 1978-1981

As sideman
With Steve Allen
 Songs for Gentle People (Dunhill, 1967)
With Paul Desmond
 Skylark (CTI, 1973 [rel. 1974])
With Charles Earland
 The Great Pyramid (Mercury, 1976)
With Coke Escovedo
 Comin' at Ya! (Mercury, 1976)
With Chico Hamilton
 Drumfusion (Columbia, 1962)
 Transfusion (Studio West, 1962 [rel. 1990])
 Passin' Thru (Impulse!, 1962 [rel. 1963])
 A Different Journey (Reprise, 1963)
 Man from Two Worlds (Impulse!, 1963 [rel. 1964])
 Chic Chic Chico (Impulse!, 1965)
 El Chico (Impulse!, 1965)
 The Further Adventures of El Chico (Impulse!, 1966)
With Charles Lloyd
 Of Course, Of Course (Columbia, 1965)
 Nirvana (Columbia, 1965 [rel. 1968])
 Waves (A&M, 1972)
 Manhattan Stories [live] (Resonance, 2014) - 2CD set; recorded 1965 
With Gary McFarland
 The In Sound (Verve, 1965)
 Profiles (Impulse!, 1966)

References

External links

1936 births
1982 deaths
Hungarian emigrants to the United States
Hungarian jazz guitarists
American male jazz musicians
Male guitarists
Musicians from Budapest
American jazz guitarists
20th-century guitarists
20th-century American male musicians
Blue Thumb Records artists
CTI Records artists
Impulse! Records artists
Skye Records artists
Hungarian male musicians
Burials at Farkasréti Cemetery